Monika Myszk (born 24 March 1982 in Gdynia) is a Polish rower.

References 
 

1982 births
Living people
Polish female rowers
Sportspeople from Gdynia
World Rowing Championships medalists for Poland
21st-century Polish women